The New World rats and mice are a group of related rodents found in North and South America.  They are extremely diverse in appearance and ecology, ranging in from the tiny Baiomys to the large Kunsia.  They represent one of the few examples of muroid rodents (along with the voles) in North America, and the only example of muroid rodents to have made it into South America.

The New World rats and mice are often considered part of a single subfamily, Sigmodontinae, but the recent trend among muroid taxonomists is to recognize three separate subfamilies.  This strategy better represents the extreme diversity of species numbers and ecological types.  

Some molecular phylogenetic studies have suggested that the New World rats and mice are not a monophyletic group, but this is yet to be confirmed.  Their closest relatives are clearly the hamsters and voles.

The New World rats and mice are divided into 3 subfamilies, 12 tribes, and 84 genera.

Classification
Family Cricetidae - hamsters, voles, and New World rats and mice
Subfamily Tylomyinae
Otonyctomys
Nyctomys
Tylomys
Ototylomys
Subfamily Neotominae
Tribe Baiomyini
Baiomys
Scotinomys
Tribe Neotomini
Neotoma
Xenomys
Hodomys
Nelsonia
Tribe Ochrotomyini
Ochrotomys
Tribe Reithrodontomyini
Peromyscus
Reithrodontomys
Onychomys
Neotomodon
Podomys
Isthmomys
Megadontomys
Habromys
Osgoodomys
Subfamily Sigmodontinae
Rhagomys incertae sedis
Tribe Oryzomyini
Oryzomys
Nesoryzomys
Melanomys
Sigmodontomys
Nectomys
Amphinectomys
Oligoryzomys
Neacomys
Zygodontomys
Lundomys
Holochilus
Pseudoryzomys
Microakodontomys
Oecomys
Microryzomys
Scolomys
Tribe Thomasomyini
Chilomys
Abrawayaomys
Delomys
Thomasomys
Wilfredomys
Aepomys
Phaenomys
Rhipidomys
Tribe Wiedomyini
Wiedomys
Tribe Akodontini
Akodon
Bibimys
Bolomys
Podoxymys
Thalpomys
Abrothrix
Chroeomys
Chelemys
Notiomys
Pearsonomys
Geoxus
Blarinomys
Juscelinomys
Oxymycterus
Lenoxus
Brucepattersonius
Scapteromys
Kunsia
Bibimys
Tribe Phyllotini
Calomys
Eligmodontia
Andalgalomys
Graomys
Salinomys
Phyllotis
Loxodontomys
Auliscomys
Galenomys
Chinchillula
Punomys
Andinomys
Irenomys
Euneomys
Neotomys
Reithrodon
Tribe Sigmodontini
Sigmodon
Tribe Ichthyomyini
Neusticomys
Rheomys
Anotomys
Chibchanomys
Ichthyomys

References
Centers for Disease Control, 2002.  "Hantavirus Pulmonary Syndrome — United States:  Updated Recommendations for Risk Reduction."  Mortality and Morbidity Weekly Report, 51:09.  Retrieved on 2007-07-13.
D'Elia, G. 2003. Phylogenetics of Sigmodontinae (Rodentia, Muroidea, Cricetidae), with special reference to the akodont group, and with additional comments on historical biogeography. Cladistics 19:307-323.
Mares, M. A., and J. K. Braun. 2000.  Graomys, the genus that ate South America: A reply to Steppan and Sullivan. Journal of Mammalogy 81:271-276.
McKenna, M. C. and S. K. Bell. 1997. Classification of Mammals above the Species Level. Columbia University Press, New York.
Steppan, S. J., R. A. Adkins, and J. Anderson. 2004. Phylogeny and divergence date estimates of rapid radiations in muroid rodents based on multiple nuclear genes. Systematic Biology, 53:533-553.

Cricetidae
Paraphyletic groups